This is a complete list of Ole Miss Rebels football seasons.

Seasons

References

Ole Miss

Ole Miss Rebels football seasons